Illinois Route 75 (IL 75) is an east–west state highway in north-central Illinois. It runs from downtown Freeport at Illinois Route 26 to WIS 67 at the Wisconsin state line southeast of Beloit, Wisconsin.

Route description 
Illinois 75 is the main route between Freeport and Beloit, and serves numerous rural areas along this alignment. It has two lanes and is an undivided surface street for its entire length, except at the interchange with U.S. Route 20 and the section east of Illinois Route 2.

History 
SBI Route 75 originally ran from Freeport to Rockton. It was extended in 1960 along Illinois Route 2 to U.S. Route 51 in South Beloit.

IL 75 was recently extended east past the former eastern terminus at I-39/I-90 (Jane Addams Tollway) to the Wisconsin state line and Wisconsin Highway 67.

Major intersections

References

External links

 Illinois Highway Ends: Illinois Route 75

075
Transportation in Stephenson County, Illinois
Transportation in Winnebago County, Illinois